Soveychti-ye Seh (also Romanized as Soveychtī-ye Seh; also known as Sovicheti-ye Seh) is a village in Gharb-e Karun Rural District, in the Central District of Khorramshahr County, Khuzestan Province, Iran. At the 2006 census, its population was 371, in 68 families.

References 

Populated places in Khorramshahr County